Bayside is a small coastal rural community in the Halifax Regional Municipality Nova Scotia, Canada. Bayside is situated on the shore of Shad Bay on the Atlantic Ocean. The community is on the Prospect Road (Route 333) which runs on the Chebucto Peninsula.

The area includes a golf course called Granite Springs. The first three digits of the postal Code for the area is B3Z.
The telephone exchange is 902  852-Aliant.

Notable people
 Derek Gaudet

References
Explore HRM

Communities in Halifax, Nova Scotia